The Tarryall School, at 31000 County Rd. in Tarryall, Colorado (formerly known as Puma City), was built in 1921.  It was listed on the National Register of Historic Places in 1985.

The school is a white one-room schoolhouse, which replaced a previous school on the site.  It was built by volunteers supervised by Ollie Parker, a carpenter.  The property also includes a teacherage.

It served as a school from 1921 to 1949.  Its highest enrollment was 35 pupils in 1908–1909.

References

One-room schoolhouses in Colorado
National Register of Historic Places in Park County, Colorado
School buildings completed in 1921
School buildings on the National Register of Historic Places in Colorado